Moody Center is a multi-purpose arena on the campus of the University of Texas at Austin (UT) in Austin, Texas. The arena, which replaces the Frank Erwin Center, stands on a former parking lot located immediately south of UT's soccer/track and field venue, Mike A. Myers Stadium. The arena seating capacity totals over 15,000 seats.

History
In 2018, it was announced that Oak View Group and UT agreed to form a public-private partnership, to build a new $375 million arena. The arena will replace the Frank Erwin Center as the home for the Texas Longhorns basketball programs, and will also function as a world-class events center for the city of Austin. The new arena is named the Moody Center following the Moody Foundation's grant of $130 million to the university. Oak View Group is funding the construction, and will manage the building in exchange for the right to keep most of the income from non-UT events, such as concerts and shows, for at least the first 35 years after opening.  UT, however, owns the land under the arena and will be the owner of the building. Under the terms of the agreement, the university will have exclusive control of the arena for 60 days each year to hold men's and women's basketball games, graduations, and other events. Oak View Group, along with partners Live Nation and C3 Presents, will have the right to hold events on the other days.

The groundbreaking ceremony took place just south of Mike A. Myers Soccer Stadium on December 3, 2019. The arena held a ribbon-cutting ceremony on April 19, 2022 and opened to the public on April 20 with a two-night concert featuring John Mayer. George Strait and Willie Nelson had two shows on April 29–30, 2022. Dave Matthews Band performed the opening night of their 2022 Summer Tour on May 11. 

The arena held its first UFC event on June 18, 2022, hosting UFC on ESPN: Kattar vs. Emmett.

The arena hosted the MF & DAZN: X Series 003 event for Deen the Great vs. Walid Sharks on November 19, 2022.

The Texas Longhorns men's basketball team held their home opener November 7, 2022 at the Moody Center against the UTEP Miners. The Longhorns marked their first home victory at the arena outscoring UTEP 72-57 with an attendance of 11,313 spectators.

Since 2022, the Moody Center has been the home venue of the Professional Bull Riders (PBR)’s Austin Gamblers during the PBR Team Series season held every summer through autumn. 

In an attempt to expand their market reach into Austin, the San Antonio Spurs will play two home games at the Moody Center on April 6 and 8, 2023 against the Portland Trail Blazers and Minnesota Timberwolves respectively, marking the first NBA regular season games to be played in Austin.

References

University of Texas at Austin
Multi-purpose stadiums in the United States
Texas Longhorns basketball venues
College basketball venues in the United States
Sports venues in Austin, Texas
Basketball venues in Texas
Indoor arenas in Texas
Sports venues completed in 2022
2022 establishments in Texas